Karijotas or Koriat (baptized Michal; died between 1358 and 1363) was the Duke of Navahrudak and Vaŭkavysk, one of the sons of Gediminas, Grand Duke of Lithuania.

According to Polish historian Jan Tęgowski, he was born probably between 1305 and 1308. He was baptized before 1349.

In 1349 Algirdas sent him along with two sons, Aikštas or Eikšis from Eišiškės and Simeon from Svislach, to Jani Beg, Khan of the Golden Horde, to negotiate an alliance against the Teutonic Knights and rising Grand Duchy of Moscow. However, Jani Beg handed Karijotas over to Simeon of Russia for a ransom.

Family
It is unclear how many children Karijotas had. The number varies between 4 and 10. Reliable data is available about four: Aleksander, George, Konstantin, and Fedir, who helped Algirdas, Grand Duke of Lithuania, to defeat the Tatars in the Battle of Blue Waters in 1363. In return, they received Podolia. Aleksander (died ca. 1380) was involved in the Galicia–Volhynia Wars between his uncle Liubartas and Casimir III of Poland. In 1366 Aleksander received Volodymyr-Volynskyi from Casimir for his service against his uncle. Only four years later, after Casimir's death, Liubartas recaptured the city. George (died in 1375 in Moldavia) at first assisted Aleksander, but was poisoned soon after accepting an invitation to become the ruler of Moldavia. Kostantin, after the Union of Krewo in 1385, moved to Hungary and died there ca. 1389. Fedir (died in 1414) inherited Navahrudak from his father and after other brothers were dead ca. 1389, became ruler of all Podolia. In 1392 he disobeyed Vytautas the Great and had to run to Hungary, where he ruled Mukachevo and built Palanok Castle. Dmitri Bobrok is also frequently listed as one of Koriat's sons.

See also
 Family of Gediminas – family tree of Karijotas
 Gediminids

References

Gediminids
14th-century deaths
Year of birth unknown